Brodac may refer to:

 Brodac Donji, a village in the city or municipality of Bijeljina, Bosnia-Herzegovina, east of adjacent village Brodac Gornji
 Brodac Gornji, a village in the city or municipality of Bijeljina, Bosnia-Herzegovina, west of adjacent village Broda Donji

 Brodac, Novo Sarajevo, in or near Sarajevo, in Bosnia-Herzegovina